Daniel Cargnin may refer to:
 Daniel Cargnin (paleontologist)
 Daniel Cargnin (judoka)